Abelkader Khamri was the Algerian minister for youth and sport in the 1992 government of Belaid Abdessalam.

References

Living people
Year of birth missing (living people)
20th-century Algerian politicians
Place of birth missing (living people)
Sports ministers of Algeria